Jacu may refer to:

 Jacu River, in the Rio Grande do Norte and Paraíba states in eastern Brazil
 Uchu Jacu, a traditional flour from the Ecuadorian province of Pichincha
 A village in Albești, Mureș, a commune in Mureș County, Romania

See also 
 Jaco (disambiguation)
 Jacuí (disambiguation)